WNZR, operating at a frequency of 90.9 FM MHz, signed on the air in October 1986. The station is owned and operated by Mount Vernon Nazarene University. The station's studios are located in Founders Hall and are part of the University's Communication Department and the School of Arts and Humanities. WNZR's broadcast tower and transmitter building is located off of Glen Road on the east end of the campus. The station serves a dual purpose as a laboratory for radio broadcasting classes and a broadcast ministry of MVNU.

WNZR is licensed by the Federal Communications Commission as a non-commercial educational (NCE) station, and is located in the NCE range of the FM bandwidth. WNZR was originally licensed to operate around 140 watts. In May 2008, the station was approved for a power increase up to 1300 watts and went live with a new transmitter on May 21, 2010. WNZR's signal now reaches into bordering counties (Licking, Morrow, and Richland). WNZR also streams online at www.wnzr.fm and has a smartphone app available on both the Google Play/Android platform and on the iTunes App Store.

WNZR is funded through support from the university's general academic budget, donations from listeners, and underwriting support from area businesses and organizations. It operates 24 hours a day, seven days a week, 365 days a year, broadcasting primarily an Adult Contemporary (AC) Christian music format, along with a variety of Christian teaching programs and athletic events. Core music artists at WNZR include Natalie Grant, Chris Tomlin, Casting Crowns, Third Day, MercyMe, Toby Mac, Jeremy Camp, Mandisa, Building 429, Steven Curtis Chapman, Francesca Battistelli, For King & Country, and the Newsboys.

External links

NZR
NZR
Mount Vernon Nazarene University